Events from the year 1310 in Ireland.

Incumbent
Lord: Edward II

Events

 Áed Bréifnech Ó Conchobair killed by Seónac Mac Uidilín, officer of his mercenaries, at the instigation of Sir William Laith de Burgh.
 Fedlimid mac Áed mac Eógan Ó Conchobhair installed as King of Connacht by Máelruanaid Mac Diarmata (Mac Dermott) at Carnfree with full ancient ceremony
 Ó Ragallaig and Mac Mathgamna campaign in Airgialla
January–June – trial of Knights Templar in Dublin
 February 9 Parliament at Kilkenny. Law passed against reception of Irishmen as members of Anglo-Irish religious houses
 after March 24 Parliament at Kildare
 Earl of Ulster builds castle at Sligo

Births

Deaths
Tanaide Mor mac Dúinnín Ó Maolconaire, seanchai (historian) and file (poet).

References

"The Annals of Ireland by Friar John Clyn", edited and translated with an Introduction, by Bernadette Williams, Four Courts Press, 2007. , pp. 240–244.
"A New History of Ireland VIII: A Chronology of Irish History to 1976", edited by T. W. Moody, F.X. Martin and F.J. Byrne. Oxford, 1982. .
http://www.ucc.ie/celt/published/T100001B/index.html
http://www.ucc.ie/celt/published/T100005C/index.html
http://www.ucc.ie/celt/published/T100010B/index.html